Glavinitsa Municipality is a municipality (obshtina) in Silistra Province, Northeastern Bulgaria, located along the right bank of Danube river in the Danubian Plain in the area of the South Dobrudzha geographical region. It is named after its administrative centre – the town of Glavinitsa.

The main road II-21 crosses the area from east to west, connecting the province centre of Silistra with the city of Ruse.

Settlements 

Glavinitsa Municipality includes the following 23 places all of them villages:

Demography 
The following table shows the change of the population during the last four decades. Since 1992 Glavinitsa Municipality has comprised the former municipality of General Zafirovo and the numbers in the table reflect this unification.

Ethnic groups 
Ethnic Turks constitute the majority of the population of Glavinitsa Municipality, followed by a large Bulgarian minority and a small Roma community.

Demographic indicators 
The municipality of Glavinitsa is losing many inhabitants. Last decade, the number of births decreased slightly while the number of deaths increased significantly.

Religion
According to the latest Bulgarian census of 2011, the religious composition, among those who answered the optional question on religious identification, was the following:

See also
Provinces of Bulgaria
Municipalities of Bulgaria
List of cities and towns in Bulgaria

References

External links
 Official website 

Municipalities in Silistra Province